From the Top of the Barrel is a live album by pianist Les McCann recorded in 1960 and released on the Pacific Jazz label in 1967. The album features additional tracks from the performances that produced Les McCann Ltd. Plays the Shout and Les McCann Ltd. in San Francisco.

Reception

Allmusic gives the album 3 stars.

Track listing 
 "Frankie and Johnny" (Traditional) - 6:10
 "Medley: But Beautiful/It Could Happen to You" (Jimmy Van Heusen, Johnny Burke) - 7:47
 "Taking a Chance on Love" (Vernon Duke, John La Touche, Ted Fetter) - 4:23
 "Love Letters" (Victor Young, Edward Heyman) - 4:06
 "Three Slaves" (Leroy Vinnegar) - 7:00
 "On Green Dolphin Street" (Bronisław Kaper, Ned Washington) - 4:55
 "Set Call: The Champ" (Dizzy Gillespie) - 1:45

Personnel 
Les McCann - piano
Herbie Lewis (tracks 1-4), Leroy Vinnegar (tracks 5-7) - bass
Ron Jefferson - drums

References 

Les McCann live albums
1967 live albums
Pacific Jazz Records live albums